Major General George Windle Read (November 19, 1860 – November 6, 1934) was a senior United States Army officer who was prominent as a corps and division commander in World War I. Read also oversaw the departure of US forces from Europe at the end of the war as commander of the American Embarkation Center at Le Havre, France.

Early life
Read was born in Indianola, Iowa, the son of James C. Read and Elizabeth Snell (Windle) Read. He graduated from the United States Military Academy (USMA) at West Point, New York, in 1883 and was commissioned as a second lieutenant of Infantry.

Early military career
Read's initial assignments were in the American West, and his first posting was with the 16th Infantry Regiment. A few months later he transferred to the 5th Cavalry Regiment, with which he served until 1889.

From 1889 to 1893, Read was Assistant Professor of Military Science at the University of Iowa, after which he returned to the 5th Cavalry Regiment in Texas.

In 1898, Read authored The Automatic Instructor: A Practical System for Home Study.

Spanish–American War
At the start of the Spanish–American War Read was assigned to an Ordnance unit, with which he served in Cuba until 1899. Receiving promotion to Captain, he served in New Mexico from 1901 to 1902, after which he was assigned to the Philippines.

Post-Spanish–American War
After leaving Cuba, Read served in California and Hawaii. From 1905 to 1909 he served on the Army's General Staff. Promoted to Major, he served in Cuba, Puerto Rico and the Philippines before attending the Army War College, from which he graduated in 1914.

Mexican border conflict
Advanced to Lieutenant Colonel after his war college graduation, Read served in Texas and Arizona during the US–Mexico border conflict, including the Pancho Villa Expedition. From 1915 to 1917 Read again served in Washington, D.C., as a member of the Army General Staff.

World War I

In April, 1917, Read (now a colonel) was appointed to head recruiting as the army began to mobilize for World War I. In August he was selected to command the 152nd Depot Brigade at Camp Upton, New York. In December Read was promoted to temporary major general and assigned to command first the 77th Infantry Division, and then the 15th Cavalry Division in El Paso, Texas.

The 15th Cavalry Division was disbanded in favor of fielding all infantry divisions, and in April, 1918 Read took command of the 30th Infantry Division, which he led to France. In June he was selected by General John J. Pershing, Commander-in-Chief (C-in-C) of the American Expeditionary Forces (AEF) on the Western Front, to command the II Corps, consisting of five divisions assigned to the British sector of the Western Front. After three of his divisions were transferred to take part in the Saint-Mihiel Offensive, Read continued to command the other two divisions, which were attached to the Australian Corps in the Ypres sector, and participated in the Hundred Days Offensive (August–November 1918) that breached the Hindenburg Line.

Read continued to command the II Corps after the Armistice. After the organization was demobilized in February, 1919 Read was assigned to command of the American Embarkation Center at Le Havre, France, where he was responsible for arranging the transportation of men and materiel back to the United States. He was also the final commander of the 42nd Infantry Division as it completed post-war occupation duty in Germany and prepared to depart Europe.

For his services during the war Read received numerous awards and decorations, which included the Army Distinguished Service Medal and the British Order of the Bath. The citation for his Army DSM states the following:

In addition, he received the French Legion of Honor (Commander), and French Croix de Guerre with Palm.

Post–World War I
In May, 1919, Read was assigned to command the US V Corps at Camp Jackson, South Carolina, with the permanent rank of brigadier general. In March, 1921 he received permanent promotion to major general.

In October, 1922, Read was appointed commander of the Philippine Department.  He assumed command in early 1923, and remained in this assignment until his 1925 retirement.

Retirement and death
In retirement Read resided in Upper Providence Township, Pennsylvania. He died at Walter Reed Army Hospital, shortly before his 74th birthday, on November 6, 1934, and was buried at Arlington National Cemetery, Section South, Site 1819.

Personal
In 1886, Read married Burton Young (1868–1944) in a ceremony that took place in El Paso.  She was the daughter of General S.B.M Young, who served as the first Army Chief of Staff. Their children included Burton Young Read (1889–1981), a career soldier who served from the early 1900s through World War II before retiring as a colonel, and George Windle Read Jr., a career soldier who served in both world wars and attained the rank of Lieutenant General as commander of the US Army Armor Center and the Second United States Army.

References

Bibliography
Borrowed Soldiers: Americans Under British Command, 1918. 2008. University of Oklahoma Press.

External links

|-

|-

|-

|-

|-

1860 births
1934 deaths
United States Army Cavalry Branch personnel
United States Army Infantry Branch personnel
University of Iowa faculty
United States Army generals of World War I
United States Military Academy alumni
American military personnel of the Spanish–American War
Recipients of the Distinguished Service Medal (US Army)
Honorary Knights Commander of the Order of the Bath
Recipients of the Croix de Guerre 1914–1918 (France)
Commandeurs of the Légion d'honneur
People from Indianola, Iowa
People from Delaware County, Pennsylvania
United States Army War College alumni
United States Army generals
Burials at Arlington National Cemetery
Military personnel from Iowa